Alacode or Alakkode may refer to:

 Alacode, Idukki district village in Idukki district
 Alakode, Kannur district village in Kannur district
 Alakkode Road, a suburb of Taliparamba
 Alamkod, Edappal, near Ponnani
 Alamcode, Thiruvananthapuram

See also
 Professor Alan Code, USA